Robert Chaperon (born 18 May 1958) is a Canadian retired professional snooker and billiards player.

Career
Chaperon was born on 18 May 1958. He played snooker on the professional tour from 1984 to 1995, and in the 1998/99, 2000/01, 2002/03 seasons, and also participated in the World Snooker Americas Tour in 1998/99, 1999/2000 and 2001/02. He won the 1990 British Open, beating Alex Higgins 10–8 in Higgins' last appearance in a major final. He reached one other ranking quarter-final, at the 1987 Grand Prix. He also won the 1990 World Cup as a member of the Canadian team, and the Canadian Snooker Championship in 1981, defeating Carey Lorraine in Ottawa. Having not played competitively for about three years, Chaperon resumed in 2007. In October 2019 he won a qualifier for the 2020 World Seniors Championship and although he was due to play in the event at the Crucible Theatre in August 2020, did not participate in the tournament. He finally made his return after 30 years to crucible in 2022 at the World Seniors but lost in the last 24 3-1 to Phillip Williams

His highest world ranking as a professional was 25.

Performance and rankings timeline

Career finals

Ranking finals: 1 (1 title)

Non-ranking finals: 1

Team finals: 1 (1 title)

Amateur finals: 3 (2 titles)

References

1958 births
Living people
Canadian snooker players